Putin is a masculine Russian surname. Its feminine counterpart is Putina.

Geographical distribution
As of 2014, 73.8% of all known bearers of the surname Putin were residents of Russia (frequency 1:22,479), 6.5% of Uzbekistan (1:54,530), 2.5% of Tajikistan (1:38,622), 2.4% of France (1:313,715), 2.2% of Belarus (1:50,006), 1.7% of Kazakhstan (1:118,628), 1.3% of Moldova (1:32,673), 1.2% of Romania (1:191,218), 1.1% of Ukraine (1:465,553) and 1.1% of India (1:8,160,269).

In Russia, the frequency of the surname was higher than national average (1:22,479) in the following subjects of the Russian Federation:
 1. Perm Krai (1:3,181)
 2. Altai Republic (1:4,161)
 3. Moscow (1:7,200)
 4. Saint Petersburg (1:10,861)
 5. North Ossetia-Alania (1:14,563)
 6. Astrakhan Oblast (1:14,649)
 7. Novosibirsk Oblast (1:15,626)
 8. Irkutsk Oblast (1:17,411)
 9. Kaliningrad Oblast (1:18,825)
 10. Novgorod Oblast (1:19,510)
 11. Khanty-Mansi Autonomous Okrug (1:20,672)
 12. Saratov Oblast (1:21,599)

People

Igor Putin (born 1953), a Russian businessman and politician, cousin of Vladimir Putin
Roman Putin (born 1977), a Russian businessman and politician, nephew of Vladimir Putin
Spiridon Putin (1879–1965), a Russian chef who was the personal cook of Lenin and Stalin, paternal grandfather of Vladimir Putin
Vladimir Putin (born 1952), President of Russia from 2000 to 2008 and from 2012–present, Prime Minister of Russia from 1999 to 2000 and 2008 to 2012
Vera Putina (born 1926), a woman who claims to be Vladimir Putin's mother
Lyudmila Putina (born 1958), the former wife of Vladimir Putin
P. T. Narasimhachar (1905–1998), a Kannada Indian poet commonly known as "Pu Ti Na" or "Putina"

Fictional people
Ivan Putin

References

Russian-language surnames